Etoka is a rural locality (selo) in Predgorny District of Stavropol Krai, Russia, located  south of Lake Tambukan, by the Etoka River, by the foot of the Mount Dzhutsa.  Population is about 3,600 (2007 est.).

It was established in the early 19th century as the khutor of Sablya. Present name was given to the village around 1897–1899. The name is derived from the Kabardian/Adyghe languages, where it means "mud valley".

References

Rural localities in Stavropol Krai